Jacques-Albert Senave (1758–1823) was a Flemish painter active in the late 18th and early 19th centuries.

He was born in Lo, Austrian Netherlands. After studying painting in the United Provinces, he went to Paris in 1780. His paintings include genre scenes and a Seven Works of Mercy he painted for the church in Lo. 

Among Senave's works is a Parody of Zeuxis which depicts the legend of the Greek artist Zeuxis selecting five female models and combining their finest features into one image of ideal beauty. In Senave's painting, the five models are overseen by a procuress, and the painter is accompanied by a dog "whose misshapen form suggests that he was composed using Zeuxis's famous method; only in this case the result is a bizarre, vaguely canine hybrid rather than an example of ideal beauty", according to the art historian Elizabeth Mansfield.  Meanwhile, a man in the foreground clutches a framed painting. Mansfield says the painting "humorously exposes the circuit of aesthetic-erotic-commercial traffic embedded within the Zeuxis myth".

Senave died in Paris in 1823.

Works 

 Brussels, Royal Museums of Fine Arts of Belgium, Parody of Zeuxis.
 Paris, Louvre, Vue de la Grande Galerie.

References

18th-century Flemish painters
19th-century Flemish painters
1823 deaths
1758 births
People from West Flanders